Wyoming Highway 160 (WYO 160) is a short  east–west Wyoming State Road located in western Goshen County in the town of Fort Laramie.

Route description

Wyoming Highway 160 is a short route at only  in length that provides access to the Fort Laramie National Historic Site and areas west and southwest of Fort Laramie. Highway 160 begins at Goshen CR 53 and travels east, passing north of the Fort Laramie Historic Site. WYO 160 crosses the North Platte River before reaching Fort Laramie where the highway ends at US Route 26 (Merriam Street).

History
Wyoming Highway 160 may have previously been routed all the way to Interstate 25 (Exit 80) in Wheatland. WYO 160 would have traveled south of Grayrocks Reservoir to Wheatland. The roadway today appears to be a county-maintained road.

Major intersections

See also

References

Official 2003 State Highway Map of Wyoming

External links 

Wyoming State Routes 100-199
WYO 160 - US 26 to Fort Laramie National Historic Site
National Park Service - Fort Laramie National Historic Site

Transportation in Goshen County, Wyoming
160